The 2013 Alabama Crimson Tide baseball team represents the University of Alabama in the 2013 NCAA Division I baseball season. The Crimson Tide play their home games in Sewell-Thomas Stadium.

Personnel

Returning starters

Roster

2013 Alabama Crimson Tide Baseball Roster

Coaching staff

Schedule and results

! style="background:#FFF; color:#8b0000;" | Regular Season
|- valign="top" 

|- bgcolor="#ccffcc"
| February 15 ||  || Sewell-Thomas Stadium || 8–3 || R. Castillo (1–0) || R. Ellis (0–1) || None ||  3,269 || 1–0 || –
|- bgcolor="#ccffcc"
| February 16 || VMI || Sewell-Thomas Stadium || 10–5 || J. Keller (1–0) || C. Henkel (0–1) || J. Hubbard (1) || 3,059 || 2–0 || –
|- bgcolor="#ccffcc"
| February 17 || VMI  || Sewell-Thomas Stadium || 7–4 || T. Hawley (1–0) || C. Bach (0–1) || J. Kamplain (1) || 3,046 || 3–0 || –
|- bgcolor="#ccffcc"
| February 19 || #21  || Sewell-Thomas Stadium || 10–8 || T. Guilbeau (1–0) || J. Winston (0–1) || None || 3,124 || 4–0 || –
|- bgcolor="#ccffcc"
| February 22 || Florida Atlantic || FAU Baseball Stadium || 5–2 || T. Hawley (2–0) || A. Archer (0–1) || J. Hubbard (2) || 559 || 5–0 || –
|- bgcolor="#ccffcc"
| February 23 || Florida Atlantic || FAU Baseball Stadium || 4–2 || J. Keller (2–0) || J. Meiers (1–1) || R. Castillo (1) || 498 || 6–0  || –
|- bgcolor="#ffbbbb"
| February 24 || Florida Atlantic || FAU Baseball Stadium || 0–3 || J. Strawn (1–0) || S. Turnbull (0–1) || H. Adams (1) || 360 || 6–1  || –
|- bgcolor="#ccffcc"
| February 26 ||  || Sewell-Thomas Stadium || 5–4 || M. Greer (1–0) || A. Garcia (0–2) || J. Kamplain (2) || 2,799 || 7–1 || –
|-

|- bgcolor="#ffbbbb"
| March 1||  || Sewell-Thomas Stadium || 0-4 || T. Rizzotti (2–1) || C. Sullivan (0–1) || None || 2,925 || 7–2 || –
|- bgcolor="#ffbbbb"
| March 2 || Tulane||Sewell-Thomas Stadium ||  2–6 || A. Byo (1–1) || J. Keller (2–1) || A. Garner (3) || 2,800 || 7–3  || –
|- bgcolor="#ccffcc"
| March 3 || Tulane || Sewell-Thomas Stadium || 12–6 || R. Castillo (2–0) || B. Wilson (1–1) || None ||  2,864 || 8–3 || –
|- bgcolor="#ffbbbb"
| March 5† ||  || Riverwalk Stadium ||  3–6 || C. Kendrick (1–0) || T. Hawley (2–1) || None || 6,911 || 8–4  || –
|- bgcolor="#ffbbbb"
| March 8|| #5 Louisville || Jim Patterson Stadium ||  3–414 || K. McGrath (1–0) || J. Shaw (0–1) || None || 1,659 || 8–5  || –
|- bgcolor="#ffbbbb"
| March 9 || #5 Louisville || Jim Patterson Stadium || 0–6 || J. Thompson (4–0) || J. Keller (2–2) || None  || 3,022 || 8–6  || –
|- bgcolor="#ffbbbb"
| March 10 || #5 Louisville || Jim Patterson Stadium || 7–810 || K. McGrath (2–0) || M. Greer (1–1) || None || 3,240 || 8–7  || –
|- bgcolor="#ffbbbb"
| March 12 ||  || Sewell-Thomas Stadium || 0–6 ||A. Gunn (1–1) || T. Guilbeau (1–1) || None || 2,982 || 8–8  || –
|- bgcolor="#ccffcc"
| March 13 || Memphis||Sewell-Thomas Stadium ||  4–2 || T. Hawley (3–1) || M. Wills (0–1) || J. Hubbard (3) || 2,917 || 9–8 || –
|- bgcolor="#ccffcc"
| March 15 |||| Sewell-Thomas Stadium ||  12–1 || C. Sullivan (1–1) || Z. Godley (1–2) || None ||  3,497 || 10–8 || 1–0
|- bgcolor="#ffbbbb"
| March 16 || Tennessee|| Sewell-Thomas Stadium ||  6–7 ||T. Bettencourt (2–1) || K. Haack (0–1) || D. Owenby (1) || 3,668 || 10–9  || 1–1
|- bgcolor="#ccffcc"
| March 17 || Tennessee || Sewell-Thomas Stadium ||  15–1 || S. Turnbull (1–1) || A. Cox (1–2) || None ||  3,376 || 11–9 || 2–1
|- bgcolor="#ccffcc"
| March 19 ||  || Joe Lee Griffin Field ||  15–7 || T. Hawley (4–1) || P. McGavin (0–3) ||None || 1,725 || 12–9 || –
|- bgcolor="#ccffcc"
| March 20 || ||Sewell-Thomas Stadium ||  6–5 || J. Hubbard (1–0) || A. Polk (2–4) ||R. Castillo (2) || 2,962 || 13–9 || –
|- bgcolor="#ccffcc"
| March 22 || ||Foley Field || 6–3 || C. Sullivan (2–1) || S. McLaughlin (3–2) || R. Castillo (3) ||  1,808 || 14–9 || 3–1
|- bgcolor="#ccffcc"
| March 23 || Georgia|| Foley Field ||  6–3|| J. Keller (3–2)|| P. Boing (1–3) || K. Haack (1)  || 2,217 || 15–9  || 4–1
|- bgcolor="#ccffcc"
| March 24 || Georgia|| Foley Field ||  3–0 || S. Turnbull (2–1) || B. Benzor (1–1) ||R. Castillo (4)  ||  1,651 || 16–9 || 5–1
|- bgcolor="#ffbbbb"
| March 26 ||   || Hoover Met ||  0–1 || S. Kelley (1–0) || T. Hawley (4–2) || J. German (1) || 854 || 16–10  || –
|- bgcolor="#ccffcc"
| March 28 || Auburn || Plainsman Park||  6–2 || C. Sullivan (3–1) || C. Kendrick (2–1) || R. Castillo (5) ||  4,043 || 17–10 || 6–1
|- bgcolor="#ffbbbb"
| March 29 || Auburn|| Plainsman Park ||  3–6 || M. O'Neal (5–2) || J. Keller (3–3) ||T. Dedrick (2) || 3,635 || 17–11  || 6–2
|- bgcolor="#ccffcc"
| March 30 || Auburn || Plainsman Park || 2–0 ||S. Turnbull (3–1)  ||W. Kendall (0–2) || None || 3,911  ||18–11  ||7–2
|-

|- bgcolor="#ccffcc"
|April 2 || || Sewell-Thomas Stadium ||  9–1 ||M. Oczypok (1–0)  ||K. Cedotal (4-4) || None || 2,958  ||19–11  ||–
|- bgcolor="#ffbbbb"
|April 4 ||#14 Arkansas|| Sewell-Thomas Stadium || 1-3 || J. Beeks (4–1) || C. Sullivan (3–2) || C. Suggs (4) || 2,990 || 19–12 || 7–3
|- bgcolor="#ffbbbb"
|April 5 ||#14 Arkansas|| Sewell-Thomas Stadium || 0–6 || R. Stanek (3–2) || J. Keller (3–4) || None || 3,787 || 19–13  || 7–4
|- bgcolor="#ccffcc"
|April 6 ||#14 Arkansas ||Sewell-Thomas Stadium || 5–0 ||S. Turnbull (4–1)  ||R. Fant (2–1) || None || 3,470  ||20–13  ||8–4
|- bgcolor="#ccffcc"
|April 9 ||||Sewell-Thomas Stadium ||  3–2 ||T. Guilbeau (2–1)  ||M. Sanchez (0–3) || R. Castillo (6) || 2,739  ||21–13  ||–
|- bgcolor="#ccffcc"
|April 10 ||Alcorn State||Sewell-Thomas Stadium|| 7–3 ||M. Oczypok (2–0)  ||R. Fuentes (0-2) || None || 2,774  ||22–13  ||–
|- bgcolor="#ffbbbb"
|April 12 ||#23  ||Swayze Field ||  0-6 || B. Wahl (6–0) || C. Sullivan (3–3) || A. Greenwood (2) || 9,894 || 22–14 || 8–5
|- bgcolor="#ffbbbb"
|April 13 || #23 Ole Miss || Swayze Field || 2–5 || T. Bailey (2–1) || J. Keller (3–5) || B. Huber (8)|| 11,729 || 22–15  || 8–6
|- bgcolor="#ffbbbb"
|April 14 || #23 Ole Miss|| Swayze Field||  3–411 || B. Huber (3–1) || R. Castillo (2–1) || None || 7,310 || 22–16  || 8–7
|- bgcolor="#ccffcc"
|April 16 || || Sewell-Thomas Stadium||  7–4 ||M. Oczypok (3–0)  ||A. Luna (0-3) || J. Shaw (1) || 3,013  ||23–16  ||–
|- bgcolor="#ffbbbb"
|April 19 ||#3 LSU||Sewell-Thomas Stadium ||  0-5 || A. Nola (7–0) || C. Sullivan (3–4) || None  || 4,089 || 23–17 || 8–8
|- bgcolor="#ffbbbb"
|April 20 ||#3 LSU||Sewell-Thomas Stadium ||8–1116  ||K. McCune (3-0) || M. Oczypok (3–1)|| None||5,948  ||  23–18 || 8–9
|- bgcolor="#ccffcc"
|April 21 ||#3 LSU|| Sewell-Thomas Stadium || 4–310 ||K. Haack (1–1)  ||J. Bourgeois (2-1) || None || 4,178  ||24–18  ||9–9
|- bgcolor="#ccffcc"
|April 24 |||| Pete Taylor Park || 7–4 ||T. Guilbeau (3–1)  ||M. McMahon (0–1) || T. Hawley (1) || 3,429  ||25–18  ||–
|- bgcolor="#ccffcc"
|April 26 || || Sewell-Thomas Stadium ||  3–2 || C. Sullivan (4–4) || D. Mengden (4–2) || R. Castillo (7) ||  3,859 || 26–18 || 10–9
|- bgcolor="#ccffcc"
|April 27 ||Texas A&M || Sewell-Thomas Stadium ||  3–2 || J. Kamplain (1–0) || P. Ray (0–1) || R. Castillo (8) ||  3,207 || 27–18 || 11–9
|- bgcolor="#bbbbbb"
|April 28 ||Texas A&M || Sewell-Thomas Stadium  || colspan=7 |Cancelled
|-

|- bgcolor="#ffbbbb"
|May 4 ||#22 Mississippi State||Dudy Noble Field || 6–10 || R. Mitchell (9–0) || S. Turnbull (4–2) || J. Holder (13) || – || 27–19  || 11–10
|- bgcolor="#ffbbbb"
|May 4 ||#22 Mississippi State ||Dudy Noble Field||  4–510 || C. Girdo (5–1) || R. Castillo (2–2) || None || 7,382 || 27–20  || 11–11
|- bgcolor="#ffbbbb"
|May 5 ||#22 Mississippi State|| Dudy Noble Field|| 6-711 || J. Holder (2–0) || C. Sullivan (3–4) || None  || 6,272 || 27–21 || 11–12
|- bgcolor="#ccffcc"
|May 7 ||  ||Sewell-Thomas Stadium  || 8–3 ||M. Oczypok (4–1)  ||D. Lostra (3-8) || T. Wolfe (1) || 2,621  ||28–21  ||–
|- bgcolor="#ccffcc"
|May 8 ||  ||Sewell-Thomas Stadium  ||  11–2 ||T. Guilbeau (4–1)  ||T. Austin (2–1) || None || 3,009  ||29–21  ||–
|- bgcolor="#ccffcc"
|May 10 || Missouri ||Sewell-Thomas Stadium || 9–7 || C. Sullivan (5–4) || E. Anderson (0–3) || R. Castillo (9) ||  2,976 || 30–21 || 12–12
|- bgcolor="#ffbbbb"
|May 11 || Missouri||Sewell-Thomas Stadium || 3–7 || K. Steelle (5–3) || S. Turnbull (4–3) || None|| 3,018 || 30–22  || 12–13
|- bgcolor="#ccffcc"
|May 12 ||Missouri||Sewell-Thomas Stadium ||  7–6 ||M. Greer (2–1)  ||J. Walsh (1–1) || None || 3,213  ||31–22  ||13–13
|- bgcolor="#ffbbbb"
|May 16 ||#1 Vanderbilt ||Hawkins Field  || 6–7 || W. Buehler (4–1) || C. Sullivan (5–5) || B. Miller (14) || 3,076 || 31–23|| 13–14
|- bgcolor="#ccffcc"
|May 17 ||#1 Vanderbilt||Hawkins Field || 5–410 ||J. Shaw (1–1)  ||B. Miller(5–1) || R. Castillo (10) || 3,357 ||32–23  ||14–14
|- bgcolor="#ffbbbb"
|May 18 ||#1 Vanderbilt||Hawkins Field|| 14–10 ||S. Rice (4–0) || T. Guilbeau (4–2) || T. Pecoraro (1)|| 3,357 || 32–24  || 14–15
|-

|-
! style="background:#FFF;color:#8B0000;"| Post-Season
|-

|- bgcolor="#ccffcc"
| May 21 ||Auburn  ||Hoover Met ||6–3 ||J. Shaw (2–1)  ||R. Carter (1–2) || R. Castillo (11) || 7,241 ||33–24  ||1–0
|- bgcolor="#ffbbbb"
| May 22 ||#2 LSU ||Hoover Met ||0–3 || C. Glen (7–2) || C. Sullivan (5–6) || C. Cotton (13) || 6,197 || 33–25 || 1–1
|- bgcolor="#ccffcc"
| May 23 || Ole Miss ||Hoover Met ||7–510  || T. Hawley (5–2)|| T. Bailey (4–2) || None ||5,705 || 34–25  || 2–1
|- bgcolor="#ffbbbb"
| May 24 ||#2 LSU ||Hoover Met ||2–3 ||N. Fury (2-1) || M. Oczypok (4–2)|| C. Cotton (14) ||11,207  ||  34–26 || 2–2
|-

|- bgcolor="#ffbbbb"
| May 31 ||Troy||Dick Howser Stadium ||2–5 ||S. McCain (9–1) ||C. Sullivan (5–7) || T. Hicks (2) ||3,206 ||34–27|| 0–1
|- bgcolor="#ccffcc"
| June 1 ||Savannah State || Dick Howser Stadium ||3–2 || M. Oczypok (5–2)|| J. May (5–4)|| R. Castillo (12) || 2,932|| 35–27 ||1–1
|- bgcolor="#ffbbbb"
| May 31 ||Troy||Dick Howser Stadium ||8–9 ||J. McGowan (2–0) ||R. Castillo (2–3) || None ||3,046 ||35–28|| 1–2
|-

† Indicates the game does not count toward the 2013 Southeastern Conference standings.
*Rankings are based on the team's current  ranking in the Baseball America poll the week Alabama faced each opponent.

Rankings

Awards and honors

Ray Castillo
All–SEC Freshman Team; RP
Kyle Overstreet
All–SEC Freshman Team; 2B
Georgie Salem
SEC Freshman of the Week; March 18
Chance Vincent
SEC Freshman of the Week; May 20
Mikey White
All–SEC Second Team; SS
SEC Freshman of the Week; February 18

Alabama Crimson Tide in the 2013 MLB Draft
The following members of the Alabama Crimson Tide baseball program were drafted in the 2013 MLB Draft.

† Indicates the player 2013-14 baseball signee

See also
 Alabama Crimson Tide baseball
 2013 NCAA Division I baseball season
 2013 Alabama Crimson Tide softball season

References

Alabama Crimson Tide Baseball Team, 2013
Alabama Crimson Tide baseball seasons
Alabama Crimson Tide baseball team
2013 NCAA Division I baseball tournament participants